The 2016 Carlton Football Club season was the Carlton Football Club's 153rd season of competition, and 120th as a member of the Australian Football League. Under new senior coach Brendon Bolton, the club finished fourteenth out of eighteen teams in the 2016 AFL season with a 7–15 record.

Club summary
The 2016 AFL season was the 120th season of the VFL/AFL competition since its inception in 1897; and, having competed in every season, it was also the 120th season contested by the Carlton Football Club. Carlton's primary home ground continued to be the Melbourne Cricket Ground, with the club playing six home matches there and five at Etihad Stadium; traditional home ground Ikon Park continued to serve as the training and administrative base. The club's two joint major sponsors were car manufacturer Hyundai, which has sponsored the club since 2008, and job seekers' service provider CareerOne, newly signed in 2016 to a two-season deal; the club's six-year association with confectionery company Mars came to an end at the end of the 2015 season. Carlton continued its alignment with the Northern Blues in the Victorian Football League, allowing Carlton-listed players to play with the Northern Blues when not selected in AFL matches.

The club faced a financially challenging schedule, with no matches in the most lucrative Friday night timeslot following poor performances in 2015. The club's membership was 50,130, a 6% increase from 2015. The club's operating profit for the season was $1.1 million, with a net deficit of $765k after depreciation and amortization – an improvement on its $2.7m net deficit in the 2015 season.

The club made a small alteration to its clash guernsey for 2016, by removing the navy blue panel around the waist of the guernsey and narrowing the widths of other blue panels and features, resulting in an overall whiter design. The design is plain white with navy blue side and shoulder panels, trimmings, monogram and number. A second match day mascot, Navy Nina, was introduced to serve as a female counterpart to established mascot Captain Carlton; as with Captain Carlton, she is a masked, navy-wearing superhero.

In June, Carlton was granted one of four Victorian licences for a team in the AFL's national women's competition, which is planned to be established from the 2017 season.

Senior personnel
Mark LoGiudice continued as club president, a role he had held since June 2014. Marc Murphy retained the role of captain for his fourth season in the role, and Kade Simpson remained vice captain; the rest of the seven-man leadership group comprised Patrick Cripps, Ed Curnow, Bryce Gibbs, Andrew Walker and Sam Docherty.

The club's coaching panel underwent significant changes after the 2015 season, following the dismissal of incumbent Mick Malthouse after Round 8, 2015. In August 2015,  assistant coach Brendon Bolton was appointed Carlton's new senior coach; the club appointed Bolton to an ongoing staff position, rather than the more typical approach of hiring a senior coach on discrete fixed term contracts, with the caveat that Bolton be paid out for his first three years if dismissed during that time. The majority of the assistant coaching panel was turned over with only John Barker, who had served as caretaker coach in 2015 following Malthouse's dismissal, and Matthew Capuano surviving from the 2015 panel. New additions to the assistant coaching panel were  assistant coach Tim Clarke (midfield),  assistant coach Dale Amos (backline),  assistant coach Shane Watson (forward-line), and  reserves coach Josh Fraser (development and VFL senior coach).

Squad for 2016
The following is Carlton's squad for the 2016 season after offseason transfers and drafts.

Statistics are correct as of end of 2015 season.
Flags represent the state of origin, i.e. the state in which the player played his Under-18s football.

For players: (c) denotes captain, (vc) denotes vice-captain, (dvc) denotes deputy vice-captain, (lg) denotes leadership group.
For coaches: (s) denotes senior coach, (cs) denotes caretaker senior coach, (a) denotes assistant coach, (d) denotes development coach, (m) denotes managerial or administrative role in a football or coaching department

Playing list changes
The following summarises all player changes which have occurred since the conclusion of the 2015 season. Unless otherwise noted, draft picks refer to selections in the 2015 AFL draft.

In

Out

List management

Season summary

Pre-season matches
The club's three scheduled pre-season matches were played as part of the 2016 NAB Challenge series.

Home and away season
Following its 2015 wooden spoon and the loss of some senior players to trades and free agency over the offseason, expectations on the club's 2016 performance were low – with some pundits even predicting that Carlton would perform worse than an  team missing twelve of its best twenty-two players due to suspensions for using illicit substances during the 2012 season. Nevertheless, the club improved significantly on its 2015 performances to finish with seven wins, three more than the previous season.

The highlight of the club's season was the seven-round stretch between Rounds 5 and 11, in which it won six of seven games, including an upset win against eventual third-placed team , which had the team sitting in a season-high tenth place with a 6–5 record. Overall across the season, the club was:
1–4 against the top four
0–4 against teams ranked fifth to eighth
3–4 against teams from ninth to thirteenth
3–3 against the bottom four

Altogether, the club's ability to defend and prevent its opponents from scoring improved greatly, conceding 376 points fewer than it had in 2015; but its lack of options in the forward-line was a continuing problem, and the club was the second-lowest scoring team in the league below only the suspension-affected Essendon.

Team records, awards and notes
Round 7 – Carlton won the Peter Mac Cup, the annual perpetual prize in Collingwood home games against Carlton.
Round 10 – Carlton defeated  for the first time since Round 5, 2010, ending a seven-game losing streak.
Round 10 – Carlton defeated  at Etihad Stadium for the first time ever, after fourteen consecutive losses dating back to 2002.

Individual awards and records

John Nicholls Medal
The Carlton Football Club Best and Fairest awards night took place on 9 September. The John Nicholls Medal, for the best and fairest player of the club, as well as several other awards, were presented on the night.

John Nicholls Medal
The winner of the John Nicholls Medal was Sam Docherty, who polled 179 votes to beat vice-captain Kade Simpson (169 votes) and 2015 winner Patrick Cripps (168 votes). It was Docherty's first John Nicholls Medal.

Other awards
The following other awards were presented on John Nicholls Medal night:-
Best First-Year Player – Jacob Weitering
Best Clubman – Ed Curnow
Spirit of Carlton Award – Kade Simpson
Bill Lanyon Inner Blue Ruthless Award – Kade Simpson
Carltonians Achievement Award – Kade Simpson
Blues Coterie Most Improved Player – Sam Docherty
Hyundai MVP Award (the most valuable player as voted by fans in an online poll) – Patrick Cripps

Milestones and game records
Round 8 – Kade Simpson played his 250th senior game for the club, the first player to reach the milestone since Anthony Koutoufides in 2006.
Round 11 – Tom Rockliff recorded 48 disposals, setting a new record for the most disposals ever recorded by a single player in a match against Carlton. (Statistics recorded since 1965).
Round 15 – Jack Silvagni, son of Stephen and grandson of Sergio, made his debut for Carlton. The Silvagnis became the first paternal grandfather-father-son trio to represent Carlton; and, with their collective 552nd game, usurped the record of Hawthorn's Kennedy family (John Sr, John Jr and Josh) for most games by a paternal grandfather-father-son trio at a single VFL/AFL club.

Season records
Patrick Cripps led the AFL in clearances for the home-and-away season with a total of 185 – the second-highest on record for a home-and-away season behind only Brett Ratten's 1999 season. For the full season including finals, Cripps was second behind Josh Kennedy, who had 191 clearances.
Sam Rowe led the AFL in one-percenters for the home-and-away season with a total of 215.

Leading Goalkickers 
Matthew Wright was Carlton's leading goalkicker for the season in his first season for the club after crossing from Adelaide. His tally of 22 goals was the fewest to lead Carlton's goalkicking since Ian Nankervis' leading tally of 18 goals in 1964.

Other awards
NAB AFL Rising Star
Jacob Weitering finished third for the 2016 NAB AFL Rising Star, polling 26 votes to finish behind Callum Mills and Caleb Daniel. Weitering was nominated for the award after his Round 3 performance against . He was the only Carlton player nominated for the season.

Honorific teams
All-Australian Team – Kade Simpson and Sam Docherty were both named in the 40-man squad for the All-Australian Team, but neither was selected in the final team.
22under22 Team – Jacob Weitering (full back), Sam Docherty (back pocket) and Patrick Cripps (follower) were all named in the 22under22 Team, an All-Australian team with selection limited to players under the age of 22.

AFLPA Awards
For each of the AFLPA awards, one or three Carlton players were nominated by an internal vote of Carlton players; Marc Murphy was also nominated for the Best Captain award by default. Weitering placed third for the best first-year player award.

Leigh Matthews Trophy (Most Valuable Player)
Sam Docherty (nominated)
Bryce Gibbs (nominated)
Kade Simpson (nominated)
Robert Rose Award (Most Courageous Player)
Kade Simpson (nominated)
Best First Year Player
Jacob Weitering (third place, 108 votes)

Carlton Football Club Hall of Fame
At the 2016 Carlton Football Club Hall of Fame dinner on 29 April, four players were inducted into the Hall of Fame and one was elevated to Legend Status:
Sergio Silvagni, who played 239 games for and won two premierships and two best-and-fairests with Carlton between 1958 and 1971, became the thirteenth player elevated to Legend Status;
Scott Camporeale, who played 233 games for and won one premiership and one best-and-fairest for the club between 1995 and 2005, was inducted;
Mil Hanna, who played 190 games for and won one premiership with the club between 1986 and 1997, was inducted;
Ian Robertson, who played 125 games for and won three premierships with the club between 1966 and 1974, was inducted;
Jack Wrout, who played 130 games for the club between 1936 and 1944 and later served as chairman of selectors, was inducted.

Other
Senior coach Brendon Bolton was inducted into the Tasmanian Football Hall of Fame for his playing and coaching career at North Launceston, North Hobart, Clarence and Tasmanian Devils.

Northern Blues 
The Carlton Football Club had a full affiliation with the Northern Blues during the 2016 season. It was the fourteenth season of the clubs' affiliation, which had been in place since 2003. Carlton senior- and rookie-listed players who were not selected to play in the Carlton team were eligible to play for either the Northern Blues seniors or reserves team in the Victorian Football League. The club's nine home matches were split with five matches at the VFL club's traditional home ground Preston City Oval, and four matches at Carlton's traditional home ground Ikon Park. The Northern Blues finished 13th out of 15 in the VFL with a record of 6–12.

References

Carlton Football Club seasons
Carlton